Finke Opera House, also known as the Ritz Theatre, is a historic opera house located at California, Moniteau County, Missouri.  It was built in 1885, and is a two-story, eclectic Late Victorian style brick building.  The building features decorative brickwork banding and segmental window arches with stone accents.  It was built as a multi-use facility and now used as a community theater / meeting hall.

It was added to the National Register of Historic Places in 2004.

References

Theatres on the National Register of Historic Places in Missouri
Victorian architecture in Missouri
Theatres completed in 1885
Buildings and structures in Moniteau County, Missouri
National Register of Historic Places in Moniteau County, Missouri
1885 establishments in Missouri